Lee Jae-yong (born 23 June 1968), known professionally in the West as Jay Y. Lee, is a South Korean business magnate who has been serving as the executive chairman of Samsung Electronics since October 2022. He is the only son of Lee Kun-hee and Hong Ra-hee. As of September 2021, Lee has an estimated net worth of US$11 billion, making him the fourth-wealthiest person in South Korea. In January 2021, Lee was sidelined from taking part in major Samsung business dealings after he resumed serving a prison sentence for his bribery and embezzlement convictions. He was pardoned in August 2022, before reinstating his position at Samsung. 

In 2014, Lee was named the world's 35th most powerful person and the most powerful Korean by Forbes Magazine's List of The World's Most Powerful People along with his father, Lee Kun-hee.

Early life and education
Jae-yong was born in Seoul, South Korea to Lee Kun-hee and Hong Ra-hee. He attended Kyungbock High School. He received his Bachelor of Arts degree in East Asian history from Seoul National University, and his Master of Business Administration degree from Keio University. He attended Harvard Business School for about five years in pursuit of a Doctor of Business Administration degree, but did not graduate. He is the cousin of CJ Group chairman Lee Jay-hyun and Shinsegae Group CEO Chung Yong-jin.

Lee is fluent in his native Korean, English, and Japanese.

Personal life
Lee has one son (born 2000) and one daughter (born 2004) with his ex-wife Lim Se-ryung. Lee Se-ryung is the Vice Chairwoman of Daesang group. Lee Se-ryung filed for divorce from Lee Jae-yong in 2009. Lee enjoys golf and horse riding.

Career at Samsung
Jae-yong started working for Samsung in 1991. He began serving as Vice President of Strategic Planning and then as "Chief Customer Officer", a management position created exclusively for Lee. His prospects for future company leadership dimmed when his father Kun-hee stepped down as Chairman due to tax evasion. In December 2009, however, his succession prospects were revived when Lee became the chief operating officer of Samsung Electronics. Since December 2012, he has been vice chairman of Samsung. He is one of the main shareholders of Samsung's financial services subsidiary, owning 11 percent of Samsung SDS. He has been described as having "been groomed to take over the family firm".

Criminal conviction and pardon
In January 2017, special prosecutors of the South Korean prosecutor's office accused Lee of bribery, embezzlement and perjury. Lee was questioned for more than 22 hours. The charges came as part of a "vast influence-peddling case" that led to the impeachment of South Korean President Park Geun-hye the preceding month. Lee was charged with bribing President Park Geun and her close friend Choi Soon-sil. 

An initial request for an arrest warrant was rejected by the Seoul Central District Court in mid-January 2017. In February 2017, Lee was formally indicted, and arrested after the Seoul Central District Court issued a warrant. Lee was charged with "offering $38 million in bribes to four entities controlled by a friend of then-President Park Geun-hye, including a company in Germany set up to support equestrian training for the daughter of one of Park’s friends, Choi Soon-sil" and "Prosecutors alleged the bribes were offered in exchange for government help with a merger that strengthened Lee’s control over Samsung at a crucial time for organizing a smooth leadership transition after his father fell ill." After his arrest, Samsung admitted to making contributions to two nonprofit foundations allegedly controlled by Choi and her Germany-based firm but denied such contributions were related to the 2015 merger. A spokesman for Samsung said, "We will do our best to ensure that the truth is revealed in future court proceedings." 

The case attracted the attention of the South Korean public; public opinion had turned against chaebols, whose influence on society angered many.

Lee was found guilty on each charge by a three-judge panel of Seoul Central District Court in August 2017 and was sentenced to five years in prison. (Prosecutors has sought a 12-year sentence.) In February 2018, the Seoul High Court reduced his prison sentence to 2.5 years, and suspended his prison sentence, leading to Lee's release after one year of detention. Subsequently, the Supreme Court of South Korea sent the case back to Seoul High Court, which held a retrial. In January 2021, Lee was sentenced to two years and six months in prison by Seoul High Court, which found him "guilty of bribery, embezzlement and concealment of criminal proceeds" worth about 8.6 billion Korean won (7.8 million U.S. dollars, £5.75 million British pounds), and found that Samsung's independent compliance committee, established in 2020, was not yet fully effective. Lee was returned to prison.

In mid-2021, the United States Chamber of Commerce, a lobbying group of American companies, joined Korean business groups to urge the president to pardon Lee, arguing that the billionaire executive can help strengthen U.S. President Joe Biden's efforts to end American dependence on computer chips produced overseas amid the global chip shortage. Lee was released on parole from the Seoul Detention Center in Uiwang on 13 August 2021; the South Korean government argued that the release was in the national interest. His parole conditions included business restrictions for five years and requiring permission before travelling outside South Korea. Upon leaving prison, Lee apologized, bowing to reporters and saying: "I've caused much concern for the people. I deeply apologize. I am listening to the concerns, criticisms, worries, and high expectations for me. I will work hard."Ron Amadeo, Samsung's leader is out of jail, allowing US factory plans to move forward, Ars Technica (August 13, 2021).

In August 2022, President Yoon Suk-yeol granted a pardon to Lee, citing Samsung's importance to the economy; the pardon opened the door for Lee to take up leadership of the conglomerate.

2021 drug conviction
On 26 October 2021, Lee was convicted for illegally using the drug propofol multiple times between 2015 and 2020 from a plastic surgery clinic. He was sentenced to paying a fine of 70 million won (US$60,055).

Management style
According to an article in Reuters, Lee is known for his "cold" determination and polite, quiet demeanor. Lee is known to reply personally to e-mails, and assumes a light-hearted attitude with reporters. In August 2021, the Korea Herald reported that Lee retained his title as Samsung's "Vice-Chairman" despite not drawing a salary or being registered as an executive in compliance with his work ban.

References

External links
 Forbes profile
 BusinessWeek profile

1969 births
Living people
20th-century South Korean businesspeople
21st-century South Korean businesspeople
Keio University alumni
Seoul National University alumni
South Korean billionaires
Samsung people
Harvard Business School alumni
People from Washington, D.C.
People from Seoul
South Korean fraudsters
South Korean prisoners and detainees
People convicted of bribery
Prisoners and detainees of South Korea
People convicted of embezzlement
Lee family (South Korea)
Recipients of South Korean presidential pardons